Armanaz Subdistrict  is a Syrian nahiyah (subdistrict) located in Harem District in Idlib.  According to the Syria Central Bureau of Statistics (CBS), Armanaz Subdistrict had a population of 27267 in the 2004 census.

References 

Subdistricts of Idlib Governorate